Emma Lampert Cooper (February 24, 1855 – July 30, 1920) was a painter from Rochester, New York, described as "a painter of exceptional ability". She studied in Rochester, New York; New York City under William Merritt Chase, Paris at the Académie Delécluse and in the Netherlands under Hein Kever. Cooper won awards at several World's Expositions, taught art and was an art director. She met her husband, Colin Campbell Cooper in the Netherlands and the two traveled, painted and exhibited their works together.

Early life
Emma Esther Lampert was born in Nunda, New York on February 24, 1855, to Henry and Jenette (Smith) Lampert. That year her father – born in Hanover, Germany – was a tanner and two other German tanners and a servant were living in the house with the family. Emma had an older sister name Mary, younger sisters Carrie and Adella, and a younger brother named Henry. The family lived in Rochester, New York and her father was a leather wholesaler by 1870. Her father registered for the draft for the American Civil War in June 1863. He died June 10, 1880.

Career

Education and early career
She graduated from Wells College in Aurora, New York, in 1875. Cooper was a founding member of the Eastern Association of Wells College alumni.

In 1877, the Rochester Art Club was formed, and Cooper was its first vice president, marking the beginning of a long relationship with the Club. She held the positions of vice president, secretary and president and was a member until 1895. From 1870 to 1886 Cooper had a studio in the historic Powers Building in Rochester, New York. Within Rochester, she had a "notable influence" on the city's art community.

She returned to New York City to study at the Art Students League and Cooper Union, and she studied under William Merritt Chase. Cooper studied in Paris at the Académie Delécluse for 18 months in the mid-1880s and under Hein Kever in the Netherlands in 1891.

Educator
From 1891 to 1893 Cooper taught painting and was the art director at the Foster School in Clifton Springs, New York, which was open between 1876 and 1885. From 1893 through 1897, Cooper taught at the Mechanics Institute, now the Rochester Institute of Technology.

Marriage
In 1897, while working and living in Dordrecht, she met painter Colin Campbell Cooper. They married on June 9, 1897 in Rochester, New York. The couple traveled abroad between 1898 and 1902, living in the Laren artist colony in the Netherlands for one year. Then, they primarily lived in New York City, and also traveled extensively, to Europe and her hometown, Rochester. They were in India in 1913, reputedly both having been commissioned by a patroness from the United States to make paintings. The works from that trip were exhibited in Rochester, New York in 1915. Because of her work in the United States and abroad, she was considered knowledgeable of the international art community.

Art works and exhibitions
Her subjects were primarily still lifes and landscapes from her travels. She closed her Rochester studio in 1886 and traveled to Paris. In 1887 she exhibited Hillside at Picardy at the Paris Salon. For her painting Breadwinner, Cooper was given an award at the Chicago's World's Fair in 1893 and the Cotton States and International Exposition in Atlanta in 1895. Cooper was awarded a gold medal at the 1902 American Art Society exhibition in Philadelphia. She exhibited oil and watercolor paintings at the St. Louis World's Fair of 1904 and won a bronze medal for a Weaving Homespun and another bronze medal. Her works were exhibited at the Paris Exposition of 1900. Cooper's paintings were exhibited with her husband' in shows in Rochester, Chicago, New York and Philadelphia, and Buffalo between 1902 and 1910. In 1915 she showed paintings of India alongside works by Alice Schille, Adelaide Deming and Helen Watson Phelps in New York.

Cooper became an artist during the 19th century when there was a significant number of women who became successful, educated artists, a rarity before that time, except for a few like Angelica Kauffman and Louise Élisabeth Vigée Le Brun (1755–1842). The emerging women artists created works with a different perspective than men, challenged the limited concepts of femininity and created a genre of floral-female landscape paintings, in which "the artist placed one woman or more in a flower garden setting and manipulated composition, color, texture and form to make the women look as much like flowers as possible." These artists were among the educated, sophisticated "New Women" beginning in the late 19th century, whose influence was largely ignored by art scholars.

Cooper was one of the well-educated artists who became a successful landscape painter and academic figure who began as a children's book illustrator and painter of miniatures and flower paintings. Realizing the difficulty in making the transition to a successful painter, particularly of landscape and figure paintings, Cooper warned other women artists of the difficulty in creating a successful career in such works. She, however, was able to overcome the obstacles and become a successful landscape artist.

Cooper was a member of the Women's International Art Club in London, Pennsylvania Academy of Fine Arts and the Women's Art Association of Canada. In New York, she was a member of Woman's Art Club, National Arts Club, and the New York Watercolor Club. She was a charter member of the Rochester Art Club and the Philadelphia Water Color Club.

Collections
Cooper's paintings are held in private and public collections, including the Memorial Art Gallery of the University of Rochester; Strong Museum in Rochester, New York; Weatherspoon Art Museum in Greensboro, North Carolina; and Wells College in Aurora, New York.

Carpathia
They aided in the rescue of survivors and shared their room and took care of survivor Irene Harris, the wife of theatre manager Henry B. Harris, who had perished in the sinking. Colin Campbell Cooper subsequently made several paintings of the Titanic.

Death
She died in 1920 at home of her sister, Mrs. John Steele in Pittsford, New York on July 30. She is buried in Mount Hope Cemetery in Rochester, New York.

In January 1940, a retrospective exhibition of her works was held at George H. Brodhead Fine Arts in Rochester. Her and her husband's papers are held in the manuscript collection of the River Campus Libraries at the University of Rochester.

Works

Europe or North America

 A Corner in the Studio, oil, 1882–1897
 A Dutch Cavalier, water color, Memorial Art Gallery, University of Rochester
 Adobe House, oil, private collection
 An Old Mill, Holland, water color, 1897–1917
 At Colorado Springs, Colorado, oil, at "Cragsmoor Artist's Vision of Nature" exhibition, Cragsmoor Free Library, New York in 1977
 Bee Hives in a French Garden, drawing, 1888, Memorial Art Gallery, University of Rochester
 Behind the Dunes
 Brittany Farmyard, oil, 1882–1897
 Canal in Holland, water color, 
 Cape Cod Vista, oil, Memorial Art Museum, University of Rochester
 Courtyard, oil, private owner
 Crooked Houses, oil, 
 Dutch Interior, oil, 1882–1897
 Geranium, oil
 Gray Day, oil, 1882–1897
 Gray Day, Mystic, Connecticut, oil, 1882–1897
 Hillside in Picardy
 Landscape, Autumn, water color, 
 Landscape, France, oil, 1882–1897
 Life Work, oil, labor interior scene, Weatherspoon Art Museum, Greensboro, North Carolina
 Little Shop, oil, 
 Little Shop, Holland, oil, at "A Century of women artists in Cragsmoor: original works by women artists who have created in Cragsmoor during the past 100 years," Cragsmoor, N.Y.: Cragsmoor Free Library, 1979
 Morning Near Riverdale, oil, Wells College, Aurora, New York
 New England Vista, oil, Memorial Art Gallery, University of Rochester
 Old Well, Pittfield, New York, water color, Strong Museum, One Manhattan Square, Rochester, New York 
 On a French River, painting, Memorial Art Gallery, University of Rochester
 Rose Covered Verandah, oil, 1897–1920
 Roses – still life, oil, in 1987 at Lagakos-Turak Gallery, Philadelphia
 San Diego Exposition 1916,  oil, interior scene, private collection
 Side Door of a Manor House, Touraine, oil, 1897–1920
 Spurting Rock, water color, 1885–1897
 Still Life, water color, 1897–1920
 The Breadwinner, water color, 1891, Memorial Art Gallery, University of Rochester
 The Farm House, water color, 
 The Marsh, oil
 Through the Meadows in Holland
 Untitled (landscape with bridge), painting, Memorial Art Gallery, University of Rochester
 Weaving Homespun, Canada, oil, Memorial Art Gallery, University of Rochester
 Wheelwright at Work, oil, figure drawing, 
 Wheelwright at Work, oil, interior scene, 
 Windmills, oil, 1897–1920
 Young Boys in Landscape, oil, in 1987 at Lagakos-Turak Gallery, Philadelphia

India
Works made in India in 1913 and exhibited in the Memorial Art Gallery in Rochester and Milwaukee in 1915 include:

 Bazaar at Little Agra
 Bombay Street
 Candy bazaar, Agra
 Ceylon House Servant
 Chauk bazaar, Lucknow
 Delhi Fruit Stand
 Dye house at Udaipur
 Entrance to a Temple, Jaipur
 Holy Man's Tomb at Agra, oil, Wells College, Aurora, New York
 Leogryphs, Rangood, Burma, water color
 Native quarter, Bombay, water color
 Snake charmer
 Street corner, Udaipur
 Street of dye houses, Little Agra
 Temple at Little Agra
 Tomb at Agra, water color
 Water carrier

References

Further reading

American women painters
1855 births
1920 deaths
Burials at Mount Hope Cemetery (Rochester)
Rochester Institute of Technology alumni
Artists from Rochester, New York
Wells College alumni
Painters from New York (state)
People from Nunda, New York
19th-century American painters
20th-century American painters
19th-century American women artists
20th-century American women artists
Students of William Merritt Chase
American people of German descent
Académie Delécluse alumni